Abílio Rafael 'Rafa' Barbosa de Sousa (born 25 June 1988 in Cete, Paredes) is a Portuguese professional footballer who plays for FC Cete as a midfielder.

References

External links

1988 births
Living people
People from Paredes, Portugal
Sportspeople from Porto District
Portuguese footballers
Association football midfielders
Primeira Liga players
Liga Portugal 2 players
Segunda Divisão players
F.C. Penafiel players
C.D. Nacional players
Moreirense F.C. players
AC Vila Meã players
Portugal under-21 international footballers